These are the airports served by American Airlines' American Eagle brand, composed of six FAA and DOT certificated regional airlines.

Three regional airlines, Envoy Air, PSA Airlines, and Piedmont Airlines, are wholly owned subsidiaries of American, but whose aircraft are in American Eagle livery. Republic Airways is independent and operates United Express and Delta Connection. SkyWest Airlines operates as American Eagle, as well as Alaska Airlines, Delta Connection and United Express. Mesa Airlines, operates in American Eagle livery and as United Express.

Envoy Air, the largest wholly-owned regional airline within the brand, is based in Fort Worth, Texas.

Listed below are all the airports served by American Eagle current as of March 2023.

Further information : Executive Airlines former Destinations

Canada
British Columbia
Vancouver - Vancouver International Airport
Nova Scotia
Halifax - Halifax Stanfield International Airport seasonal
Ontario
Toronto – Toronto Pearson International Airport
Quebec
Montreal – Montréal-Pierre Elliott Trudeau International Airport
Québec City – Québec City Jean Lesage International Airport seasonal

Caribbean
Bahamas
Abaco Islands
Marsh Harbour – Marsh Harbour Airport
Eleuthera
North Eleuthera – North Eleuthera Airport
Exuma
George Town – Exuma International Airport
Grand Bahama Island
Freeport – Grand Bahama International Airport
New Providence Island
Nassau – Nassau International Airport
Guadeloupe
Pointe-à-Pitre – Pointe-à-Pitre International Airport
Martinique
Fort-de-France – Martinique Aimé Césaire International Airport

Mexico
Aguascalientes
Aguascalientes – Aguascalientes International Airport
Baja California Sur
Loreto- Loreto International Airport
Chihuahua
Chihuahua – Chihuahua International Airport
Coahuila
Torreón – Torreón International Airport
Durango
Durango-Durango International Airport
Guerrero
Ixtapa-Zihuatanejo-Ixtapa-Zihuatanejo International Airport
Jalisco
Guadalajara – Miguel Hidalgo y Costilla Guadalajara International Airport
Michoacán
Morelia – Morelia International Airport
Nuevo León
Monterrey - Monterrey International Airport via Republic Airways
Oaxaca
Santa María Huatulco - Bahias de Huatulco International Airport
Querétaro
Queretaro – Querétaro Intercontinental Airport
Quintana Roo
Cozumel - Cozumel International Airport
San Luis Potosí
San Luis Potosí – San Luis Potosí International Airport
Sinaloa
Mazatlan – Mazatlán International Airport
Sonora 
Hermosillo - Hermosillo International Airport
 Yucatán
Mérida – Mérida International Airport

United States
Alabama
Birmingham – Birmingham-Shuttlesworth International Airport
Huntsville/Decatur – Huntsville International Airport
Mobile – Mobile Regional Airport
Montgomery – Montgomery Regional Airport
Arizona
Flagstaff – Flagstaff Pulliam Airport
Phoenix – Phoenix Sky Harbor International Airport Hub
Tucson – Tucson International Airport
Yuma – Yuma International Airport
Arkansas
Fayetteville – Northwest Arkansas National Airport
Ft. Smith – Fort Smith Regional Airport
Little Rock – Clinton National Airport
Texarkana – Texarkana Regional Airport
California
Bakersfield – Meadows Field Airport
Burbank – Bob Hope Airport
Fresno – Fresno Yosemite International Airport
Long Beach – Long Beach Airport
Los Angeles – Los Angeles International Airport Hub
Monterey – Monterey Regional Airport
Ontario – Ontario International Airport
Palm Springs – Palm Springs International Airport
Sacramento – Sacramento International Airport
San Francisco – San Francisco International Airport
San Jose – San Jose International Airport
San Luis Obispo – San Luis Obispo County Regional Airport
Santa Barbara – Santa Barbara Municipal Airport
Santa Rosa – Charles M. Schulz–Sonoma County Airport
Colorado
Aspen – Aspen-Pitkin County Airport seasonal
Colorado Springs – Colorado Springs Airport
Denver – Denver International Airport
Durango – Durango-La Plata County Airport
Eagle/Vail – Eagle County Regional Airport seasonal
Hayden – Yampa Valley Airport seasonal
Montrose – Montrose Regional Airport seasonal
Grand Junction – Grand Junction Regional Airport
Gunnison – Gunnison–Crested Butte Regional Airport seasonal
Connecticut
Hartford – Bradley International Airport
Florida
Daytona Beach – Daytona Beach International Airport
Destin/Ft. Walton Beach – Destin–Fort Walton Beach Airport
Fort Lauderdale – Fort Lauderdale–Hollywood International Airport
Fort Myers – Southwest Florida International Airport
Gainesville – Gainesville Regional Airport
Jacksonville – Jacksonville International Airport
Key West – Key West International Airport
Miami – Miami International Airport Hub
Melbourne – Melbourne Orlando International Airport
Orlando – Orlando International Airport
Pensacola – Pensacola International Airport
Sarasota/Bradenton – Sarasota–Bradenton International Airport
Tallahassee – Tallahassee International Airport
Tampa – Tampa International Airport seasonal
West Palm Beach – Palm Beach International Airport seasonal
Georgia
Atlanta – Hartsfield–Jackson Atlanta International Airport
Augusta – Augusta Regional Airport
Savannah – Savannah/Hilton Head International Airport
Illinois
Bloomington – Central Illinois Regional Airport
Champaign – University of Illinois Willard Airport
Chicago – O'Hare International Airport Hub
Moline – Quad Cities International Airport
Peoria  – General Wayne A. Downing Peoria International Airport
Springfield – Abraham Lincoln Capital Airport
Indiana
Evansville – Evansville Regional Airport
Ft. Wayne – Fort Wayne International Airport
Indianapolis – Indianapolis International Airport
South Bend – South Bend International Airport
Iowa
Cedar Rapids – The Eastern Iowa Airport
Des Moines  – Des Moines International Airport
Dubuque  – Dubuque Regional Airport
Sioux City – Sioux Gateway Airport
Waterloo – Waterloo Regional Airport
Kansas
Garden City – Garden City Regional Airport
Manhattan – Manhattan Regional Airport
Wichita – Wichita Dwight D. Eisenhower National Airport
Kentucky
Covington/Cincinnati – Cincinnati/Northern Kentucky International Airport
Louisville – Louisville International Airport
Lexington – Blue Grass Airport
Louisiana
Alexandria – Alexandria International Airport
Baton Rouge – Baton Rouge Metropolitan Airport
Lafayette – Lafayette Regional Airport
Lake Charles  – Lake Charles Regional Airport
Monroe  – Monroe Regional Airport
New Orleans – Louis Armstrong New Orleans International Airport
Shreveport – Shreveport Regional Airport
Maine
Bangor – Bangor International Airport
Portland – Portland International Jetport
Maryland
Baltimore  – Baltimore-Washington International Airport
Salisbury/Ocean City – Salisbury–Ocean City–Wicomico Regional Airport
Massachusetts
Boston – Logan International Airport
Martha's Vineyard – Martha's Vineyard Airport  seasonal
Nantucket – Nantucket Memorial Airport  seasonal
Worcester – Worcester Regional Airport
Michigan
Detroit – Detroit Metropolitan Wayne County Airport
Flint – Bishop International Airport
Grand Rapids – Gerald R. Ford International Airport
Kalamazoo – Kalamazoo-Battle Creek International Airport
Lansing – Capital Region International Airport
Marquette – Sawyer International Airport
Traverse City – Cherry Capital Airport
Minnesota
Minneapolis – Minneapolis–Saint Paul International Airport
Rochester – Rochester International Airport
Mississippi
Jackson – Jackson-Evers International Airport
Gulfport – Gulfport–Biloxi International Airport
Hattiesburg-Laurel – Hattiesburg–Laurel Regional Airport
Meridian – Meridian Regional Airport
Missouri
Columbia – Columbia Regional Airport
Joplin – Joplin Regional Airport
Kansas City – Kansas City International Airport
Springfield – Springfield–Branson National Airport
St. Louis – St. Louis Lambert International Airport
Montana
Billings – Billings Logan International Airport
Bozeman – Bozeman Yellowstone International Airport  seasonal
Nebraska
Grand Island – Central Nebraska Regional Airport
Omaha – Eppley Airfield
Nevada
Reno – Reno–Tahoe International Airport
New Hampshire
Manchester – Manchester–Boston Regional Airport
New Jersey
Newark – Newark Liberty International Airport
New Mexico
Albuquerque – Albuquerque International Sunport
Santa Fe – Santa Fe Regional Airport
Roswell – Roswell International Air Center
New York
Albany – Albany International Airport
Buffalo – Buffalo Niagara International Airport
Ithaca – Ithaca Tompkins International Airport
Long Island/Islip – Long Island MacArthur Airport
New York City
John F. Kennedy International Airport Hub
LaGuardia Airport Hub
Newburgh – Stewart International Airport
Rochester – Greater Rochester International Airport
Syracuse – Syracuse Hancock International Airport
Watertown – Watertown International Airport
White Plains – Westchester County Airport
North Carolina
Asheville – Asheville Regional Airport
Charlotte – Charlotte Douglas International Airport Hub
Fayetteville – Fayetteville Regional Airport
Greensboro – Piedmont Triad International Airport
Greenville – Pitt–Greenville Airport
Jacksonville – Albert J. Ellis Airport
New Bern – Coastal Carolina Regional Airport
Raleigh – Raleigh-Durham International Airport
Wilmington – Wilmington International Airport
North Dakota
Bismarck – Bismarck Municipal Airport
Fargo – Hector International Airport
Ohio
Akron – Akron–Canton Airport
Cleveland – Hopkins International Airport
Columbus – John Glenn Columbus International Airport
Dayton – Dayton International Airport
Toledo – Toledo Express Airport
Oklahoma
Lawton – Lawton–Fort Sill Regional Airport
Oklahoma City – Will Rogers World Airport
Stillwater – Stillwater Regional Airport
Tulsa – Tulsa International Airport
Oregon
Eugene – Eugene Airport
Medford – Rogue Valley International-Medford Airport
Portland – Portland International Airport
Redmond/Bend – Roberts Field
Pennsylvania
Allentown – Lehigh Valley International Airport
Erie – Erie International Airport
Harrisburg – Harrisburg International Airport
Philadelphia – Philadelphia International Airport Hub
Pittsburgh – Pittsburgh International Airport
Scranton/Wilkes-Barre – Wilkes-Barre/Scranton International Airport
State College – University Park Airport
Williamsport – Williamsport Regional Airport
Rhode Island
Providence – T. F. Green Airport
South Carolina
Charleston – Charleston International Airport
Columbia – Columbia Metropolitan Airport
Florence – Florence Regional Airport
Greenville – Greenville–Spartanburg International Airport
Hilton Head – Hilton Head Airport
Myrtle Beach – Myrtle Beach International Airport
South Dakota
Rapid City – Rapid City Regional Airport
Sioux Falls – Sioux Falls Regional Airport
Tennessee
Bristol – Tri-Cities Regional Airport
Chattanooga – Chattanooga Metropolitan Airport
Knoxville – McGhee Tyson Airport
Memphis – Memphis International Airport
Nashville – Nashville International Airport
Texas
Abilene – Abilene Regional Airport
Amarillo – Rick Husband Amarillo International Airport
Austin – Austin–Bergstrom International Airport
Beaumont – Jack Brooks Regional Airport
Brownsville – Brownsville/South Padre Island International Airport
College Station – Easterwood Airport
Corpus Christi – Corpus Christi International Airport
Dallas/Fort Worth – Dallas/Fort Worth International Airport Hub
Del Rio – Del Rio International Airport
El Paso – El Paso International Airport
Harlingen – Valley International Airport
Houston
George Bush Intercontinental Airport
William P. Hobby Airport
Killeen – Killeen-Fort Hood Regional Airport
Laredo – Laredo International Airport
Longview – East Texas Regional Airport
Lubbock – Lubbock Preston Smith International Airport
McAllen – McAllen Miller International Airport
Midland/Odessa – Midland International Airport
San Angelo – Mathis Field
San Antonio – San Antonio International Airport
Tyler – Tyler Pounds Regional Airport
Waco – Waco Regional Airport
Wichita Falls – Wichita Falls Regional Airport
Utah
Salt Lake City – Salt Lake City International Airport
St. George – St. George Regional Airport
Vermont
Burlington – Burlington International Airport
Virginia
Charlottesville – Charlottesville–Albemarle Airport
Lynchburg – Lynchburg Regional Airport
Newport News – Newport News/Williamsburg International Airport
Norfolk – Norfolk International Airport
Richmond – Richmond International Airport
Roanoke – Roanoke–Blacksburg Regional Airport
Washington
Seattle/Tacoma – Seattle–Tacoma International Airport
Washington, D.C. (District of Columbia)
Washington, D.C. – Ronald Reagan Washington National Airport Hub
Dulles, Virginia – Washington Dulles International Airport
West Virginia
Charleston – Yeager Airport
Huntington – Tri-State Airport
Wisconsin
Appleton – Appleton International Airport 
Green Bay – Green Bay–Austin Straubel International Airport
La Crosse – La Crosse Regional Airport
Madison – Dane County Regional Airport
Milwaukee – Milwaukee Mitchell International Airport
Wausau – Central Wisconsin Airport
Wyoming
Jackson Hole – Jackson Hole Airport seasonal
Cheyenne – Cheyenne Regional Airport

See also
List of American Airlines destinations

References

Lists of airline destinations
Oneworld affiliate destinations
American Airlines